Petrophila phaeopastalis is a moth in the family Crambidae. It was described by George Hampson in 1917. It is found in Colombia.

References

Petrophila
Moths described in 1917
phaeopastalis